Scott Ledger (born 1 September 1952) is an Australian cricketer. He played in two first-class matches for Queensland in 1972/73.

See also
 List of Queensland first-class cricketers

References

External links
 

1952 births
Living people
Australian cricketers
Queensland cricketers
People from Nambour, Queensland
Cricketers from Queensland